The Hushan Dam is a dam in Douliu City, Yunlin County, Taiwan. It is the newest dam in Taiwan.

History and objectives
The planning of the dam started already in 1979 and but was approved by Executive Yuan only in 2001. The stated goals of the dam are to "improve both quantity and quality for the domestic water supply in Yunlin County, reduce abstraction of ground water, slow down subsidence and improve environmental quality". Land subsidence, associated with groundwater extraction, has been a problem particularly in Yunlin. Critics maintain that industry needs motivated the dam.

The construction of the dam started in 2002 by Continental Engineering Corporation. However, the construction was delayed for three times due to environmental and historical site preservation issues. Construction was completed in December 2015. The dam was officiated on 2 April 2016 by President Ma Ying-jeou when the sluice gate was closed and the dam started to store water.

Technical details
Water to the dam is diverted from the Qingshui River, a tributary of the Zhuoshui River. The dam can store up to 52.18 million m3 of water. The supply of water from Hushan Reservoir and the nearby Jiji Weir to Yunlin will eventually reach 432,000 tons per day.

See also
 List of dams and reservoirs in Taiwan

References

2016 establishments in Taiwan
Buildings and structures in Yunlin County
Dams completed in 2016
Dams in Taiwan